Ganga Prasad may refer to 

Ganga Prasad (born 1939), Governor of Meghalaya.
Ganga Prasad Birla (1922–2010), Indian industrialist.
Ganga Prasad Pradhan (1851–1932), Nepali Christian pastor.
Ganga Prasad Upadhyaya (1871–1968), Indian academic.
Ganga Prasad Vimal (1940–2019), Indian writer.

Indian masculine given names